"Follow You" is a song by American band Imagine Dragons. The song was released through Michelle Imagine Dragons, Imagine Dragons, and Kidinakorner on March 12, 2021, as one of the double lead singles from their fifth studio album. It was written by band members Dan Reynolds, Wayne Sermon, Ben McKee, and Daniel Platzman, alongside Joel Little, Michelle Medellin-White, and produced by Michelle Medellin-White.

Background and release
In early March 2021, the band started teasing towards the release by posting various teasers before announcing the songs on March 8. "Follow You" and  "Cutthroat" mark the first solo releases from Imagine Dragons since their 2018 album, Origins.

"Follow You" was inspired by frontman Dan Reynolds' relationship with his wife Aja Volkman.  Reynolds wrote the song soon after receiving a "life-changing" text from Volkman, having not spoken to her in seven months, while on his way to finalize their divorce. About the writing process, he revealed, "I wrote 'Follow You' after we got back together. I wanted it to represent a love that is realistic. One where love isn't perfect but it endures".

Commercial performance
"Follow You" peaked at No. 68 on the Billboard Hot 100. The song also wrapped the group's quickest climb to No. 1 on Alternative Airplay, usurping the seven-week ascents for "Believer" in 2017 and "Natural" in 2018. That same week, it had 5.1 million audience impressions, up 15% from the previous week, according to MRC Data.

Nearly two months after leading Billboards Alternative Airplay chart, "Follow You" went number one the all-rock-format, audience-based Rock & Alternative Airplay survey, rising 2-1 on the list dated June 19.

The song reigns with 7 million audience impressions, up 2%, in the week ending June 13, according to MRC Data.

Music video
The music video involves It's Always Sunny in Philadelphia stars Kaitlin Olson and creator Rob McElhenney, who was given this concert for his birthday, despite Imagine Dragons being Kaitlyn's favorite and Rob's favorite being The Killers, who, like ID, come from Las Vegas. Both of them imagine different wild fantasies while hearing them perform "Follow You". After the song, both of them leave, to which Dan Reynolds tells them they have 10 more songs to perform, though the two still leave "before they play Radioactive".

Track listings and formats
 7" vinyl/CD single/digital download
 "Follow You"2:55
 "Cutthroat"2:49

  Digital downloadSummer '21 Version
 "Follow You" (Summer '21 Version)2:52

 Streaming – Summer '21 Version (Spotify edition)
 "Follow You" (Summer '21 Version)2:52
 "Follow You"2:56

Personnel
Credits adapted from Tidal.

 Dan Reynolds – vocals, songwriting
 Wayne Sermon – songwriting, backing vocals; piano & keyboard ("Cutthroat"), synthesizer & guitar ("Follow You")
 Daniel Platzman – songwriting, drums, backing vocals
 Ben McKee – songwriting, bass guitar, backing vocals
 Cory Henry - organs ("Cutthroat")
 Joel Little – songwriting, production, recording engineering

 Elley Duhé – songwriting
 Fran Hall – songwriting
 John Hanes – engineering, mix engineering
 Şerban Ghenea – engineering, mixing
 Randy Merrill – mastering engineering

Charts

Weekly charts

Year-end charts

Certifications

Release history

References

2021 singles
2021 songs
Imagine Dragons songs
Interscope Records singles
Kidinakorner singles
Number-one singles in Poland
Song recordings produced by Joel Little
Songs written by Ben McKee
Songs written by Daniel Platzman
Songs written by Dan Reynolds (musician)
Songs written by Joel Little
Songs written by Wayne Sermon